The Basketball Africa League Hakeem Olajuwon Most Valuable Player Award (MVP) is an annual Basketball Africa League (BAL) award given to the best player of a given season. The award is named after all-time great Hakeem Olajuwon. The award was first handed out in the inaugural season to Walter Hodge.

Winners

Notes

References

Basketball most valuable player awards
Most Valuable Player